A New Year picture is a popular Banhua in China. It is a form of colored woodblock print, used for decoration and the performance of rituals during the Chinese New Year Holiday. In the 19th and 20th centuries some printers began to use the genre to depict current events.

Background 
The origins of the "New Year picture" are unknown, although the genre is thought to have begun with the printing of door gods during the Tang dynasty. By the 19th century door gods were joined by other household protective and auspicious deities including the Kitchen God, and the God of Wealth. Images of women and babies were common, as were depictions of New Year observances, popular narratives, and depictions of the theater. Customarily, as each Chinese New Year arrives, every family replaces its New Year picture in order to "say goodbye to the Past and welcome the Future" (Chinese: 辞旧迎新).

In the late-19th and early 20th century woodblock printers began to supplement traditional religious and folkloric themes with depictions of current events and modern themes including the Sino-French War, the First Sino-Japanese War, the Boxer Rebellion, and railways. These themes and events have no connection with the New Year, and so the appropriateness of the New Year Picture nomenclature is questionable. Nonetheless, all images created by traditional printers are typically categorized as such.

New Year pictures were printed throughout China. The best known production sites include Yangliuqing (Tianjin), Yangjiabu (Shandong), Wuqiang (Hebei), Fengxiang (Shaanxi), Taohuawu (Suzhou), and Mianzhu (Sichuan). Yangliuqing, is widely regarded as being the most prominent and influential contributor to the New Year Picture industry.

History
Although there are few reliable records on which to base the early history of New Year pictures, Wang Shucun argues that they were popularized during the Ming dynasty. This development can be attributed to Ming government policy, the spread of popular novels, the development of woodblock printing techniques. and the development of large-scale production and marketing through New Year picture workshops (Chinese: 畫坊) (Pinyin:Huà fāng).

Given the seasonal nature and ephemeral quality of New Year pictures, very few authentic examples can be dated to before the 19th century. Nonetheless, it is believed that the industry flourished from the late-Ming dynasty and throughout the Qing. In Weifang a workshop built in the Ming dynasty has been connected with the local production of New Year pictures. It contains a production room, a display room WangFang (Chinese: 望房), an accountant’s office, guest rooms, and rooms for the workshop’s owner. The organization of the workshop indicates the New Year picture artisans’ business model, whereby the artisans both produce and market their wares.

The introduction of mechanized printing and changing aesthetic preferences in the early 20th century posed a serious challenge to New Year picture printers, and production declined until by the 1930s only a few workshops could be found in the formerly prosperous printing centers like Yangliuqing and Yangjiabu. During the Anti-Japanese War of Resistance the Chinese Communist Party realized the propaganda potential of "peasant art" and began to promote "New New Year pictures". The traditional industry, however, did not recover and was nearly extinguished by the 1960s. Following the Cultural Revolution efforts were made to recover New Year pictures as a heritage industry, and workshops can now be found in most of the larger production centers.

Production method
Production method: hand drawn pictures, woodblock printing, watermark trapping,
Half-drawing and half-painting, lithography, offset printing and so on.

Usually, chromatic woodblock New Year picture production follows four steps:

First, the artist draws a rough sketch on paper,

Second, the rough sketch is carved in relief on a woodblock,

Third, separate blocks are carved for each of the colors to be added,

Finally, the printer inks the outline block and presses paper onto its surface using a stiff brush. The procedure is repeated for each of the color blocks. In some cases color may be added by hand. The chromatic woodblock New Year picture is complete.

In some production centers, most notably Yangliuqing, only the outline is printed while all of the colors are added manually. In other locations such as Mianzhu the pictures are drawn and colored entirely by hand. These traditional techniques survive in the present day, although most New Year pictures are now produced through chromolithography and color offset printing.

Themes

The content of New Year pictures is diverse, but several main themes can be identified:

 1.  Immortals and Auspicious symbols

Commonly depicted immortals include Door Gods, Kitchen God, and God of Wealth. Auspicious symbols may include lions, tigers, deer, cranes, Phoenix and auspicious birds, lotus, peony and other flowers, money tree, pot of wealth and other objects that express wishes for good fortune and happiness.

 2. Secular life

Some folk artists created idealized depictions of rural and domestic life showing productive agriculture, family life, festive customs, humorous anecdotes, etc.

 3. Baby and beauty

Images of babies (typically male), alone or in the company of young mothers, are very common motifs, as are images of beauties, alone or in the company of babies.

 4. Narratives

Narratives adapted from historical events, folk stories, myths, legends, novels, and dramas.

See also
Surimono

Further reading
Madeline Yue Dong, “The Fortunes of a Folk Tradition: Yangliuqing New Year’s Pictures,” in James Cook, Joshua Goldstein, Sigrid Schmalzer eds., Visualizing Modern China. Rowman and Littlefield, 2009.

James A. Flath, The Cult of Happiness: Nianhua, Art, and History in Rural North China. University of British Columbia Press, 2004.

References

Chinese painting
Chinese New Year
Printmaking